Erebia iranica  is a  butterfly found in the East  Palearctic (Caucasus North Iran, Turkey) that belongs to the browns family. E. iranica Gr.-Grsh. was described as a forma of Erebia tyndarus from North Persia. It is often smaller than the nymotypical form of tyndarus, the band of the fore- and hindwing being rather bright russet-red. The subapical ocelli of the forewing are large and bear bright white pupils.

Subspecies
E. i. iranica
E. i. sheljuzhkoi Warren, 1935 (Caucasus)

See also
List of butterflies of Russia

References

External links
 Images representing Erebia iranica at Barcodes of Life
Lepidoptera Caucasi

Satyrinae
Butterflies described in 1895